Winston Aubrey Aladar deBalkan Marshall (born 20 December 1987) is an English musician and podcaster. He is best known as the former banjoist and lead guitarist of the British folk rock band Mumford & Sons. Prior to this he was in the bluegrass sleaze rap group Captain Kick and the Cowboy Ramblers. With Mumford & Sons, Marshall has won multiple awards, including a Grammy and two Brit Awards. He has performed music with different supergroups and collaborated with Baaba Maal and HVOB. After leaving Mumford & Sons, Marshall started an interview podcast with The Spectator.

Early life and family
Winston Aubrey Aladar deBalkan Marshall was born in Wandsworth, London, on 20 December 1987, to Sir Paul Marshall, a British tycoon and co-founder of the Marshall Wace hedge fund, and Sabina de Balkany, from a genteel European Jewish family. He has a sister, singer/songwriter Giovanna. His mother is French, and his maternal grandmother was property tycoon Molly de Balkany, one of the first female property developers in France; Marshall's maternal great-uncle was the billionaire developer and collector . Through Robert's marriages, Marshall's great-aunts include Genevieve François-Poncet, daughter of André François-Poncet, and Princess Maria Gabriella of Savoy. Molly and Robert were the children of Hungarian-Romanian businessman Aladar Zellinger, with the family relocating to France after World War II; they added "de Balkany" to the name upon arrival in France. Marshall has said that thirteen members of his family "were murdered in [...] the Holocaust", and that his maternal grandmother was a survivor. Marshall was educated at St Paul's School, an independent school in London. In 2010, The Guardian wrote that "there's [nothing] inherently wrong with musicians being privately educated. It's just a bit grating when one of them insists on going by the name "Country" Winston Marshall".

Marshall began playing guitar aged thirteen and started a ZZ Top cover group called Gobbler's Knob. While the other members of Mumford & Sons were influenced by jazz, Marshall described the genre in 2013 as "the lowest form of art". He was inspired to play banjo after seeing O Brother, Where Art Thou?, switching to folk music and wearing his hair in dreadlocks. Referring to his youth exploits, he saw himself as a trustafarian, and chose not to attend university in order to play music. Marshall and future bandmate Marcus Mumford met as teenagers at church, playing worship music at a church group together and in a worship band, with Mumford saying Marshall is "magnetic to be around". Marshall, a multi-instrumentalist, has said that he chose to focus on banjo over guitar because there were fewer banjoists and so it was easier for him to get session jobs.

Career

Early music
In the early 2000s, Marshall was in a bluegrass sleaze rap band called Captain Kick and the Cowboy Ramblers, who had songs such as "Jesse the Gay" and "Country London". Marshall was credited as "Country Winston Driftwood" and played the banjo, guitar, dobro, mandolin, and harmonica. With Captain Kick and the Cowboy Ramblers, Marshall ran a jam night "for teenagers who wanted to drink and play music" at Bosun's Locker, a tiny music club beneath a pasty shop on the King's Road in Fulham. The jam nights attracted a number of musicians who had an affinity for earthy acoustic music, including Noah and the Whale and Laura Marling.

Mumford & Sons

The group Mumford & Sons came together in December 2007 after its four members had already been performing together in various configurations. Co-founder Mumford started songwriting after seeing Marshall's band Captain Kick, and other similar artists, perform while Mumford was at university in Edinburgh; Mumford was struggling at the time and found Marshall's music "a glimpse of salvation", especially as Marshall encouraged him to join them on-stage. The first Mumford & Sons performances took place in 2005 at Marshall's Bosun's Locker jam nights as informal performances of the musicians "like a hoedown". Mumford began performing here, and was joined by Marshall as well as other musician friends with whom he had previously performed, including Ben Lovett and Ted Dwane. As well as together, Dwane, Marshall, and Mumford all performed with Marling's band during the jam sessions. Mumford said that "eventually, Ted [Dwane], Ben [Lovett], and Winston [Marshall] stuck. It wasn't until [they] started writing songs together that [they] realized this was an actual band and not just a singer/songwriter with a couple of mates." Marshall played the banjo, guitars, dobro, and provided backing vocals, for the group, and was often identified as the comic relief of the line-up.

The band performed at Glastonbury Festival in 2008 and released their debut EP later the same year. Marshall and Mumford took jobs in the antique shop run by Marshall's mother in order to save money to produce and record music with Mumford & Sons. They toured with Marling and Johnny Flynn from 2008 to 2009; Marshall was nervous to perform in the United States, knowing that banjo is more common there than in the United Kingdom and their audience would know if he was good or not. In 2009, they cut their tour songs as their first album. The album, Sigh No More, on which Marshall is credited as "Country Winston", was released that year along with the single "Little Lion Man"; written by Mumford, the song was nominated at the 2011 Grammy Awards as Best Rock Song. The band was nominated for the Grammy for Best New Artist, and performed at the ceremony with Bob Dylan and the Avett Brothers. Sigh No More won the Brit Award for British Album of the Year in 2011.

The album was influenced by the music of Fleet Foxes, the Avett Brothers, Kings of Leon and Gomez; for Pitchfork, Stephen Deusner wrote that the band made this clear by pushing their musical references "with a salesman's insistence." It was released to minimal attention but steadily garnered more positive reviews, and while Deusner criticized the album as derivative, he was impressed that "there are some unexpected textures, mostly courtesy of some guy calling himself Country Winston playing banjo and dobro." The success of the bluegrass banjo-led album placed Mumford & Sons as the breakout of nu-folk music. They followed the album with near-constant touring, cementing their presence, though concert reviews were also mixed, criticizing the repetitiveness of the samey setlist while acknowledging the crowd's enjoyment. Chris Richards of The Washington Post added that the musicians' stage presence, particularly Marshall "thrusting his pelvis like a bluegrass Rick James", was irritating.

In 2010, Mumford & Sons were the band and back-up for Marling's album I Speak Because I Can and released a joint EP with Marling and Indian group Dharohar Project. Self-titled with all three acts' names, it saw generally warm reviews that praised Marshall's dueling-banjo additions to songs. The group continued to tour extensively, and released their second album, Babel, which had a more rock sound, in 2012 to mixed reviews. Marshall provided lead vocals for the song "For Those Below". In the same year, Mumford & Sons contributed songs to two films: "The Enemy" for Wuthering Heights and "Learn Me Right" with Birdy for the soundtrack of the Pixar film Brave.

Babel became the quickest-selling album of the year, and the growing success of Mumford & Sons led to more detraction, with the band, and its banjo specifically, often criticized as inauthentic; Marshall told The Guardian that he disagreed, saying they are authentic because they play music that they enjoy and at which they are good. The band embraced other criticisms, creating a tongue-in-cheek music video for single "Hopeless Wanderer", parodying their own image. In it, Marshall was portrayed by Jason Bateman. With Babel, Marshall shed his "Country Winston" name, saying he had outgrown it (as a holdover from Captain Kick) and had become disillusioned towards country music; when he began playing the genre he associated it with bluegrass music, and then found that he did not like the country music he heard in the United States. At the same time, he expressed distaste towards the banjo and said that he does not really know how to play it and had been told by his hero Jerry Douglas to not learn, quoting Douglas saying: "The reason that it's interesting what you do is that you have no f***ing idea what you're doing!" Babel won the Grammy for Album of the Year in 2013, with the band being awarded the Brit Award for British Group the same year. They were also honored with the Ivor Novello Award for International Achievement in 2014.

The band went on hiatus in 2013, but contributed to a compilation album by Idris Elba released in 2014, re-recording their song "Home" with Thandiswa Mazwai. There is no banjo on Wilder Mind, an electronic rock album that was influenced by the National; Aaron Dessner was a producer. Though his bandmates disagreed, Marshall said that they changed the sound because they did not enjoy touring so much with a limited repertoire. However, he also said that he had warmed to the banjo again after time away from having to play it, and used it on the band's 2015 tour. The album received mediocre reviews, with critics in disagreement on whether losing the banjos improved the band or not; The Guardian wrote that it "was far less polarising" than their first two albums, due to being "numbingly boring" and lacking the band's USP. The next year they released an EP, Johannesburg, with African artists Baaba Maal, Beatenberg and the Very Best; they had been approached to do the project after Marshall worked with Maal on other music. The EP does not use the banjo. Marshall sang lead vocals on the song "Fool You've Landed", which he co-wrote with then-girlfriend Dianna Agron and Beatenberg's Matthew Field.

Mumford & Sons then worked on their fourth album, Delta, which was released in 2018. The album uses banjo again, but in non-folk ways. Marshall said that Delta: "does sound to me like the culmination of 10 years' work. I'm proud of it for that". The music draws more on their adult life experiences than their previous work, with the Evening Standard noting that during its creation Marshall got married but also experienced depression. Marshall said that since the album was not their first and wouldn't be their last, they felt freedom to branch out in sound. He started writing some of the songs on Delta in Nashville, where Agron was filming a movie and they became engaged. Lovett said Marshall "was throwing these pretty left-field sounds out of these writing sessions in Nashville"; Marshall was encouraged by sound engineer Garrett Miller to try more synthesized music, resulting in "Picture You", and composed the first verse and the falsetto hook of "Woman" there. He also wrote "Wild Heart", which was recorded so quickly he did not actually perform on the track on the album. Spin noted the three songs were the more powerful of the album's stripped-back songs.

Marshall took the early components of "Woman" to his bandmates in Brooklyn, and Lovett said of the moment: "[it] just felt like something that was very, very different, but also felt really good. Maybe that was a moment that we felt unshackled by anything that we had done previously." Marshall said that despite the song title, "Woman" is about the love shared by the couple. It is an R&B indie song, with Mumford saying they were influenced by Jai Paul; Marshall used a five-string cello banjo on it, disguising the banjo sound, with three banjo tracks layered. Rolling Stone felt that "Picture You" and "Woman" sounded like Khalid songs; The Observer compared them to Coldplay songs. The album received sub-par reviews.

In March 2021, Marshall faced criticism for lauding Unmasked: Inside Antifa's Radical Plan to Destroy Democracy, a book written by conservative American journalist and social media personality Andy Ngo. Later that month, Marshall apologised for praising the book and stated that he would be taking a break from the band "to examine [his] blindspots"; in June 2021, he wrote an essay defending his support for Ngo, discussing the reaction to his apology for the tweet, and announcing that he would be permanently leaving Mumford & Sons so that he could exercise free speech about politics without involving his former bandmates. In a 2022 interview with The Sunday Times Magazine he said that what made it hard to leave the band was that he had thought they would still be playing together in their sixties.

Individual music and other ventures
In 2010, Marshall was involved with a supergroup called Mt. Desolation, recording music and performing shows with Ronnie Vannucci Jr. of The Killers, Tom Hobden of Noah and the Whale, and Jesse Quin and Tim Rice-Oxley of Keane. They released a free download single, "State of Affairs", as well as the self-titled album Mt. Desolation. In 2012, Marshall played the banjo for the Dropkick Murphys song "Rose Tattoo"; the band joked that they "kidnapped" him after playing the same festival, adding that his banjo part is "subtle, but with that rolling finger-picking style, you know it's him when you hear it". Marshall then joined a different, temporary, supergroup called Salvador Dalí Parton in October 2013, with fellow musicians Gill Landry of Old Crow Medicine Show; Mike Harris of Apache Relay; Jake Orrall of JEFF the Brotherhood; and Justin Hayward-Young of the Vaccines. The band, intended as a joke from the start, wrote six songs in 20 minutes on their first day together, held a rehearsal the next day, and performed six shows around Nashville, Tennessee, that night before breaking up.

He has also pursued stand-up comedy, taking improv classes at the Upright Citizens Brigade (UCB) prior to 2013, and planning a comedy web series in 2015. He said that he wanted to take the concept of UCB to England, because they "don't have anything like it", and was invited to perform a monologue there; Vulture wrote that the monologue, about "condoms and being Jewish", "didn't go well." When asked if he is Jewish, Marshall laughingly replied "ish".

In 2015, Marshall became interested in techno music and electronic dance music after he attended every night of a James Ford residency at London club XOYO. Ford had been working with Mumford & Sons on their album Wilder Mind through his group, Simian Mobile Disco, and, inspired, Marshall began working on an individual electronic side-project that went nowhere. In 2017, he collaborated with electronic duo HVOB. Marshall approached HVOB by sending an email that they initially thought was fake. When they began working together, Marshall sent samples to HVOB, who are based in Vienna. Together they released the single "The Blame Game", on which Marshall contributes vocals, and the album Silk. They had only planned to release an EP, but quickly chose to extend this to a full album despite needing to meet the same deadline. The album is darker than HVOB's other music, with the duo saying that Marshall took their sound and styled it for a concert rather than club. Marshall and HVOB toured Europe in April 2017 on the fifteen-city Silk Tour. The single and album were positively reviewed.

Marshall collaborated individually with Baaba Maal between 2013 and 2015, at the 2013 and 2014 editions of the Blues du Fleuve festival and playing banjo on Maal's 2015 album The Traveller. He experimented with more music in 2019 when he remixed the Maggie Rogers song "Light On" and Kevin Garrett song "Don't Rush".

In January 2021, Marshall created a group that aims to connect Hong Kongers encouraged to immigrate to the UK with British residents, following the implementation of the Hong Kong national security law,

In January 2022 launched the "Marshall Matters" podcast. It is hosted by British magazine The Spectator, for which Marshall became a contributor in 2021, and will see him interview people working in creative industries "to find out what indeed is the state of the arts". Of his career move into being a "culture warrior", he said that "Having made all this huge sacrifice so that [he could] speak [his] mind, [he] might as well fucking do it then. It would seem stupid not to."

Influence

The existence of the British nu-folk scene has been credited to Marshall, as its most successful acts – Marling, Flynn, Hayward-Young, Noah and the Whale, Alan Pownall, King Charles, Alessi's Ark, Peggy Sue – all "graduated" from performing at Bosun's Locker on the folk jam nights that he ran, reportedly starting them as a way to play banjo. One musician who played there said: "I don't think you could pin the craze on anyone else."

Marshall's banjo playing in Mumford & Sons has also affected the popularity and credibility of the instrument. Emmylou Harris said that the band made banjo respectable, and their music is deemed responsible for a banjo revival both in Europe and the United States. The band's identity is said to be synonymous with the banjo, and Marshall has a Deering banjo named after him, the Winston Marshall Signature Model.

Personal life
Marshall dated Irish stylist Susan Cooney, who dressed Mumford & Sons and Haim, and in March 2012 attended the White House British State dinner with her.. Marshall wrote the song “Susie” with Mumford & Sons under the moniker “The Wedding Band” in 2010. It was first reported that Marshall was dating American actress Dianna Agron in July 2015, and the couple got engaged in late 2015. They were married on 15 October 2016, in Morocco, and kept their relationship private, including not posting about each other on social media. They separated in 2019 and divorced in 2020. 

In 2022, Marshall said that after several album tours, the lifestyle negatively affected him, leading him to start self-medicating with alcohol and to regularly take a mix of hard drugs, describing the time as "all a bit of a blur"; he got sober in 2019, saying this gave him clarity and energy. He then had a "painful separation" from Agron and, when they divorced, returned to his Christian faith.

He is an avid supporter of Manchester United. He was described as enthusiastic about fashion in 2010, comparing his style to that of the Brideshead Revisited character Sebastian Flyte, though has since expressed regret for choosing to wear this fashion for photoshoots rather than clothes he would personally wear. In 2011, he was said to look like "the Appalachian hillbilly version of an Appalachian hillbilly, in shitkicker boots and a ratty semi-mohawk that he appears to have given himself with a whittling knife"; he became more interested in style and grooming in 2012 after GQ named him the sixth-worst-dressed man in the world. In 2018 he was introduced to dance by Agron, and has taken several classes at Kristen Sudeikis' Forward Space dance studio. Other Forward Space dancers are featured in the music video for "Woman".

Marshall is interested in the books of the Canadian professor of psychology Jordan Peterson, and invited Peterson to Mumford & Sons' studio in 2018, with Peterson sharing a photograph of them together on social media. When asked about his involvement with Peterson, who has been a controversial figure, Marshall told CBC Radio: "I don't think [Peterson's] psychology is controversial, but the quasi-political stuff... I think it's a conversation we're having a little bit as a band and, do we want to get into the political stuff?" Later in 2018, Marshall told  NME that he "[thinks] everyone should read widely. If you read something, work out who's got the opposite opinion and read that guy so you can form your own ideas." In the same interview, both Marshall and Mumford opined that musicians should not talk about politics, and said that they did not like being asked about politics, with Marshall telling the magazine:

On 7 July 2022 he was a guest on the BBC's political programme Question Time, discussing the resignation of British Prime Minister Boris Johnson which had been announced that day.

Selected discography

With Mumford & Sons

Individual

Notes

References

External links
 

1987 births
British Christians
British people of French-Jewish descent
British people of Hungarian-Jewish descent
British people of Romanian-Jewish descent
British folk guitarists
Mumford & Sons members
British folk rock musicians
British folk singers
British rock bass guitarists
British banjoists
Grammy Award winners
Living people
21st-century British singers
21st-century English bass guitarists